Amastus mossi is a moth of the family Erebidae. It was described by Walter Rothschild in 1922. It is found in Peru and Ecuador.

References

mossi
Moths described in 1922
Moths of South America